The Vyne Ring or the Ring of Silvianus is a gold ring, dating probably from the 4th century AD, discovered in a ploughed field near Silchester, in Hampshire, England, in 1785. Originally the property of a British Roman called Silvianus, it was apparently stolen by a person named Senicianus, upon whom Silvianus called down a curse.  

After its discovery in the 18th century, the ring became the property of the Chute family, whose country house was The Vyne, also in Hampshire, now a National Trust property.  The ring went on display there in April 2013.

In 1929, during excavations of the site of the Roman temple of Nodens at Lydney Park, the archaeologist Sir Mortimer Wheeler discovered details of the curse. As Wheeler consulted with J. R. R. Tolkien on the name of the god invoked in the curse, the ring and curse may have inspired the One Ring in The Hobbit and The Lord of the Rings

Description 
The Ring of Silvianus is larger than most rings, being  in diameter and weighing , and was perhaps intended to be worn over a glove. The band of the ring has ten facets. It is set with a square bezel engraved with an image of the goddess Venus. To one side are the letters "VE" and to the other side "NVS", in mirror writing.   When used as a signet ring to make a seal, the head and script would be raised, and the letters would appear the right way around.  

The band is inscribed with the words "SENICIANE VIVAS IIN DE".  This contains two errors as the "I" has been doubled, leaving no room for the last letter "O".   The inscription should have finished "VIVAS IN DEO" – a common inscription for Roman Christians, meaning "live in God".

History

The Ring of Silvianus was discovered in 1785 in the field of a farm near Silchester, a town of Roman origins, and the site of many archaeological discoveries. It is unknown how the ring came to be located at The Vyne, but it is presumed that the farmer who found the ring sold it to the family, who were known to have an interest in history and antiquities.  In 1888, the owner of the property, Chaloner Chute, wrote about the ring in the history of the house. 

In the early 19th century a lead plaque of a type known as a "curse tablet" or defixio was discovered at the site of a Roman temple dedicated to the god Nodens at Lydney Park, Gloucestershire,  from The Vyne. The plaque was inscribed with a curse:

In 1929, the archaeologist Sir Mortimer Wheeler was excavating at the Lydney site and made a connection between the ring bearing the name of Senicianus, and the curse stone bearing the same name.  Wheeler called upon J.R.R. Tolkien, as Professor of Anglo-Saxon at Oxford University, to investigate the etymology of the name "Nodens" referred to in the curse.

Until recently the Ring of Silvianus remained in the library at The Vyne and was little known, but was placed on display for the first time in April 2013, in its own exhibition, along with a copy of the inscription on the curse tablet.

Association with Tolkien 

It is hypothesised that Wheeler, in his discussion with Tolkien on the name Nodens on the curse tablet, would also have discussed the ring at The Vyne, with which he was familiar, though there is no proof of this. It is thought that other aspects of the archaeology of the Lydney area, including an Iron Age Roman fort, may have influenced Tolkien's writings. 

The One Ring plays a central part in The Hobbit (published 1937) and The Lord of the Rings (1954).  In Tolkien's legendarium, the One Ring was forged by the Dark Lord Sauron in order to enslave the inhabitants of Middle-earth.

The Tolkien Society have been associated with setting up the "Ring Room" at Vyne, which includes the Ring of Silvianus in a rotating display case, a first edition of The Hobbit and a copy of the curse.  There is also a Middle-earth adventure playground in the grounds. Lynn Forest-Hill of the Tolkien Society expressed pleasure at the discovery of a material source for the One Ring described in Tolkien's novels, stating that all sources previously cited have been literary or legendary, such as the Ring of the Nibelungs.

References 

Curses
Roman archaeology
Roman Britain
Tolkien studies
Individual rings
Ancient Roman jewellery